Louis Bergeron (1 October 1811 in Chauny – 1 August 1890 in Croissy) was a 19th-century French journalist, writer and playwright.

Works 

1833: Campagnes d'Espagne et de Portugal sous l'Empire
1839: Fables démocratiques
1839: Un Neveu, s'il vous plaît, one-act folie-vaudeville, with Albéric Second
1840: L'Andalouse de Paris, one-act vaudeville, with Michel Delaporte
1842: Une jeunesse orageuse, wo-act comédie en vaudeville, with Charles Desnoyer
1845: L' article de la mort, physiologie d'un enterrement
1846: Le fou de Béthune, feuilleton
1847: L'Officier de marine, one-act vaudeville, with Bricet
1850: Chronique parisienne, under the pseudonym Émile Pagès
1852: Un mauvais père
1868: La Vérité sur les tontines indument appelées assurances mutuelles sur la vie
1870: Qu'est-ce que l'assurance sur la vie ?
1872: L'Avenir des familles
1873: Qu'est ce que l'assurance sur la vie ?
1874: Un Rêve de banquier philanthrope
1875: La Confession de Madame X...
1876: Aux Riches
1876: Les Sept milliards de la guerre remboursés en quarante-cinq ans sans augmentation d'impôts. Projet de conversion du 5 p. 100
1877: Une Pierre de touche
1886: La Providence des artistes
1888: Quelle est ma vie?, with Leo Tolstoy
1891: Œuvres de L. Bergeron sur les assurances
1892: Entre Femmes, causerie intime
1894: Assurances sur la vie. Le Talisman, souvenirs d'un assuré, posth.

Bibliography 
 Joseph-Marie Quérard, Charles Louandre, Félix Bourquelot, La Littérature française contemporaine: XIXe siècle, 1848, (p. 315)
 François Rittiez, Histoire du règne de Louis-Philippe Ier: 1830 à 1848, 1856, (p. 74)
 Gustave Vapereau, Dictionnaire universel des contemporains, 1858, (p. 173) 
 Staaff, La Littérature française depuis la formation de la langue jusqu'à nos jours, volume 3, 1885, (p. 1241)
 Côté Croissy (n°30), January 2008 (read online)

External links 
 Louis Bergeron on medias19
 Bergeron Louis on Le Maitron en ligne

19th-century French journalists
French male journalists
19th-century French dramatists and playwrights
1811 births
People from Aisne
1890 deaths
19th-century French male writers